The Vuelta a Peru is a road cycling race held in Peru. The race exists of a men's competition over a prologue and eight stages.

Past winners

References

 Results

Cycle races in Peru
Recurring sporting events established in 2005
Recurring sporting events disestablished in 2007
Men's road bicycle races
2005 establishments in Peru